Robert Crosser (June 7, 1874 – June 3, 1957) was an American lawyer and politician who served 19 terms as a U.S. Representative from Ohio. He remains the longest-serving member of the United States House of Representatives from the state of Ohio, serving from 1911 to 1919, then again from 1923 until 1955.

Life and career
Born in Holytown, Lanarkshire, Scotland, Crosser emigrated to the United States in 1881 with his parents and settled in Cleveland, Ohio.
He moved to Salineville, Ohio, the same year and attended the public schools.
He graduated from Kenyon College, Gambier, Ohio, in 1897.
He studied law at Columbia Law School in New York City and graduated from Cincinnati Law School in 1901.
He was admitted to the bar in 1901 and commenced practice in Cleveland, Ohio.
He taught law at Baldwin-Wallace Law School in 1904 and 1905.
He served as member of the State house of representatives in 1911 and 1912.
He served as member of the fourth constitutional convention in 1912. At the convention, he was the author of the Initiative and referendum amendment adopted by the voters in 1912.

Congress 
Robert Crosser was elected as a Democrat to the Sixty-third, Sixty-fourth, and Sixty-fifth Congresses (March 4, 1913 – March 3, 1919).
He served as chairman of the Committee on Expenditures in the Department of Commerce (Sixty-fifth Congress).
He was an unsuccessful candidate for renomination in 1918 and for election in 1920.

Crosser was elected to the Sixty-eighth and to the fifteen succeeding Congresses (March 4, 1923 – January 3, 1955).
He served as chairman of the Committee on Interstate and Foreign Commerce (Eighty-first and Eighty-second Congresses).

He was an unsuccessful candidate for renomination in 1954. In that race, he was defeated in the primary by Charles Vanik in a field of candidates that also included African-American challenger John Holly, founder of the Negro Future Outlook League.

Death
He resided in Bethesda, Maryland, until his death there on June 3, 1957.
He was interred in Highland Park Cemetery, Warrensville, Ohio.

Robert Crosser was married to Isabelle Dargarvel Hogg.

Crosser was a member of Phi Delta Phi.

Election results

See also 
 List of United States representatives from Ohio

References

Sources 

1874 births
1957 deaths
Kenyon College alumni
Columbia Law School alumni
University of Cincinnati College of Law alumni
Politicians from Cleveland
Ohio Constitutional Convention (1912)
Scottish emigrants to the United States
Democratic Party members of the Ohio House of Representatives
People from Salineville, Ohio
Democratic Party members of the United States House of Representatives from Ohio